Yuri Schukin and Dmitri Sitak were the defending champions, but they chose not to compete this year.Diego Junqueira and Martín Vassallo Argüello won in the final 2–6, 6–4, [10–8], against Carlos Berlocq and Sebastián Decoud.

Seeds

Draw

Draw
{{16TeamBracket-Compact-Tennis3-Byes
| RD1=First round
| RD2=Quarterfinals
| RD3=Semifinals
| RD4=Finals
| RD1-seed01=1
| RD1-team01= M Fischer P Oswald
| RD1-score01-1=64
| RD1-score01-2=6
| RD1-score01-3=[2]
| RD1-seed02= 
| RD1-team02=
| RD1-score02-1=7
| RD1-score02-2=2
| RD1-score02-3=[10]
| RD1-seed03= 
| RD1-team03= R Bautista-Agut U Ignatik
| RD1-score03-1=6
| RD1-score03-2=6
| RD1-score03-3= 
| RD1-seed04=WC
| RD1-team04= C Borroni M Crugnola
| RD1-score04-1=4
| RD1-score04-2=3
| RD1-score04-3= 
| RD1-seed05=4
| RD1-team05= JS Cabal A González
| RD1-score05-1=6
| RD1-score05-2=4
| RD1-score05-3=[6]
| RD1-seed06= 
| RD1-team06= G Bastl P Clar-Rosselló
| RD1-score06-1=1
| RD1-score06-2=6
| RD1-score06-3=[10]
| RD1-seed07=WC
| RD1-team07= F Gaio A Giannessi
| RD1-score07-1=6
| RD1-score07-2=7
| RD1-score07-3= 
| RD1-seed08= 
| RD1-team08= J Millman D Smethurst
| RD1-score08-1=3
| RD1-score08-2=5
| RD1-score08-3= 
| RD1-seed09=WC
| RD1-team09= G Couillard T Oger
| RD1-score09-1= 
| RD1-score09-2= 
| RD1-score09-3= 
| RD1-seed10= 
| RD1-team10= O Charroin V Stouff
| RD1-score10-1=w/o
| RD1-score10-2= 
| RD1-score10-3= 
| RD1-seed11= 
| RD1-team11= B Balleret B Paire
| RD1-score11-1=1
| RD1-score11-2=1
| RD1-score11-3= 
| RD1-seed12=3
| RD1-team12= T Gabashvili D Matsukevich
| RD1-score12-1=6
| RD1-score12-2=6
| RD1-score12-3= 
| RD1-seed13= 
| RD1-team13= F Aldi D Giorgini
| RD1-score13-1=7
| RD1-score13-2=2
| RD1-score13-3=[8]
| RD1-seed14= 
| RD1-team14= C Berlocq S Decoud
| RD1-score14-1=62
| RD1-score14-2=6
| RD1-score14-3=[10]
| RD1-seed15= 
| RD1-team15= T Kamke D Meffert
| RD1-score15-1=64
| RD1-score15-2=1
| RD1-score15-3= 
| RD1-seed16=2
| RD1-team16= J Delgado S Kadir
| RD1-score16-1=7
| RD1-score16-2=6
| RD1-score16-3= 
| RD2-seed01= 
| RD2-team01=
| RD2-score01-1=6
| RD2-score01-2=2
| RD2-score01-3=[10]
| RD2-seed02= 
| RD2-team02= R Bautista-Agut U Ignatik
| RD2-score02-1=2
| RD2-score02-2=6
| RD2-score02-3=[7]
| RD2-seed03= 
| RD2-team03= G Bastl P Clar-Rosselló
| RD2-score03-1=5
| RD2-score03-2=4
| RD2-score03-3= 
| RD2-seed04=WC
| RD2-team04= F Gaio A Giannessi
| RD2-score04-1=7
| RD2-score04-2=6
| RD2-score04-3= 
| RD2-seed05= 
| RD2-team05= O Charroin V Stouff
| RD2-score05-1=6
| RD2-score05-2=6
| RD2-score05-3= 
| RD2-seed06=3
| RD2-team06= T Gabashvili D Matsukevich
| RD2-score06-1=4
| RD2-score06-2=3
| RD2-score06-3= 
| RD2-seed07= 
| RD2-team07= C Berlocq S Decoud
| RD2-score07-1=6
| RD2-score07-2=6
| RD2-score07-3= 
| RD2-seed08=2
| RD2-team08= J Delgado S Kadir
| RD2-score08-1=3
| RD2-score08-2=4
| RD2-score08-3= 
| RD3-seed01= 
| RD3-team01=

References
 Main Draw

Sanremo Tennis Cup - Doubles
Sanremo Tennis Cup